Putnam County Schools is a school district headquartered in Winfield, West Virginia. It serves Putnam County.

Schools
Schools divided by area:

Buffalo Area:
 Buffalo High School
 George Washington Middle School
 George Washington Elementary School
 Buffalo Elementary School
 Confidence Elementary School
Hurricane Area:
 Hurricane High School
 Hurricane Middle School
 Conner Street Elementary School
 Hurricane Town Elementary School
 Lakeside Elementary School
 Mountain View Elementary School
 West Teays Elementary School
Poca Area:
 Poca High School
 Poca Middle School
 Poca Elementary School
 Hometown Elementary School
 Rock Branch Elementary School
Winfield Area:
 Winfield High School
 Winfield Middle School
 Winfield Elementary School
 Eastbrook Elementary School
 Scott-Teays Elementary School

References

External links
 Putnam County Schools

Putnam
Education in Putnam County, West Virginia